Ania Monica Caill (born October 24, 1995) is a French-born alpine skier who competes internationally for Romania. She represented Romania at the 2014 Winter Olympics in the alpine skiing events.

Biography
Caill originally competed for France, winning the French championships in her age category in 2011. However, she switched to the Romanian team in June 2012 citing a lack of opportunity on the French team that was to compete in Sochi. She is allowed to compete for Romania because it is her mother's home country. At the 2018 Pyeongchang Olympics, Caill planned to compete in the giant slalom. However, due to bad weather, the giant slalom race was postponed and clashed with the training runs of the Super G, which she preferred.

World Cup results

Results per discipline

Standings through 25 January 2021

World Championship results

Olympic results

References

External links
 
 

1995 births
Living people
Olympic alpine skiers of Romania
Alpine skiers at the 2014 Winter Olympics
Alpine skiers at the 2018 Winter Olympics
Romanian female alpine skiers
Sportspeople from Limoges
French female alpine skiers
French people of Romanian descent